Western Run–Belfast Road Historic District is a national historic district at Lutherville, Baltimore County, Maryland, United States. It is a largely agricultural area was first settled in the 18th century and is a natural extension of the Worthington Valley Historic District.  It includes the village of Butler forming a small commercial crossroads with its general store, post office, and firehouse.

It was added to the National Register of Historic Places in 1979.

References

External links
, including photo dated 1978, at Maryland Historical Trust
Boundary Map of the Western Run–Belfast Road Historic District, Baltimore County, at Maryland Historical Trust

Historic districts in Baltimore County, Maryland
Georgian architecture in Maryland
Federal architecture in Maryland
Colonial Revival architecture in Maryland
Historic districts on the National Register of Historic Places in Maryland
Lutherville, Maryland
National Register of Historic Places in Baltimore County, Maryland